1986 U.S. Open may refer to:
1986 U.S. Open (golf), a major golf tournament
1986 US Open (tennis), a Grand Slam tennis tournament